Mason Finley (born October 7, 1990), is an American shot putter and discus thrower. He was on the track and field team at the University of Kansas before transferring to the University of Wyoming. He qualified for the 2020 Summer Olympics in discus.

Early life
Finley was born in Kansas City, Missouri.  He attended Buena Vista High School (where he also played basketball and football) in Buena Vista, Colorado, and then the University of Kansas, before transferring to the University of Wyoming.

For his high school dominance, Finley was named to the ESPN RISE 2000s All-Decade High School Track & Field Team.  He was also Track and Field News "High School Athlete of the Year" in 2009.

Career
Finley set a Colorado high school record in discus with a throw of  during the High Altitude Challenge in Alamosa, Colorado. He also won gold medals in shot put and discus throw at the 2009 Pan American Junior Athletics Championships in Port of Spain, Trinidad.  As a freshman at Kansas, he was All American in the shot put and the discus.  His best throws as a freshman were 60.12m (197–3 ft.) in the discus and 20.68 meters (67-10.25 ft.) in the shot.

In 2017 Finley won the bronze medal in the discus throw event at the World Championships in London, throwing 68.03 meters. This breaks an 18-year drought of no American medalists in the discus throw, and marks the first time an American has placed in the men's discus throw since the World Championships in Seville, where Anthony Washington won the gold medal.

References

External links

DyeStat profile for Mason Finley
University of Wyoming track profile
University of Kansas track profile

1990 births
Living people
Track and field athletes from Kansas City, Missouri
American male shot putters
American male discus throwers
Kansas Jayhawks men's track and field athletes
Athletes (track and field) at the 2016 Summer Olympics
Olympic track and field athletes of the United States
Universiade medalists in athletics (track and field)
World Athletics Championships athletes for the United States
World Athletics Championships medalists
Universiade bronze medalists for the United States
USA Outdoor Track and Field Championships winners
Medalists at the 2011 Summer Universiade
Athletes (track and field) at the 2020 Summer Olympics
21st-century American people